Antiplanes motojimai is a species of sea snail, a marine gastropod mollusk in the family Pseudomelatomidae.

One subspecies: Antiplanes motojimai aquilonalis Kantor & Sysoev, 1991

Description
The length of the shellattains 40 mm.

Distribution
This marine species occurs off Japan.

References

 Habe, T. (1958b) Description of three new species of the genus Rectiplanes from Japan. Venus, 20, 181–186
 Hasegawa K. (2009) Upper bathyal gastropods of the Pacific coast of northern Honshu, Japan, chiefly collected by R/V Wakataka-maru. In: T. Fujita (ed.), Deep-sea fauna and pollutants off Pacific coast of northern Japan. National Museum of Nature and Science Monographs 39: 225-383

External links
 

motojimai
Gastropods described in 1958